Zarechnaya is a rural locality (a village) in Komarichsky District, Bryansk Oblast, Russia. The population was 206 as of 2010. There are 7 streets.

Geography 
Zarechnaya is located 6 km west of Komarichi (the district's administrative centre) by road. Bocharovo is the nearest rural locality.

References 

Rural localities in Komarichsky District
Sevsky Uyezd